CrissCross is a 1992 American drama film directed by Chris Menges and written by Scott Sommer, based on his homonymous novel. It stars Goldie Hawn, Arliss Howard, Keith Carradine, Steve Buscemi, and David Arnott.

Plot 
Divorced mom Tracy Cross (Hawn) raises her 12-year-old son, Christopher (Arnott), in Key West in 1969 around the time of the Apollo 11 moon landing. Chris narrates the film in voiceover and talks about his "screwed up" life living with his mother in a cheap hotel. Chris' father (Carradine) was an Annapolis trained fighter pilot who had served in Vietnam. However, he became seriously disturbed after bombing a civilian hospital and burned his uniform as a "killers costume". Falling into alcoholism, he deserts Chris and Tracy moving into a commune separating himself from society. Chris hasn't seen his father in three years and still loves him deeply.

Chris delivers papers and fish to help support his mother who works as a bartender and waitress. He unwittingly discovers that there are drugs hidden in the fish he is delivering and becomes a small time drug dealer out of desperation when he finds his mother, Tracy, has resorted to working as a stripper to support them. She is ashamed when he confronts her with this, but she tells him that sometimes in life one has to do what is not good to get what is. Chris visits his father in the commune and attempts to get him to reconcile with Tracy but to no avail.

A stranger, Joe (Howard), comes to town and strikes up a relationship with Tracy. This further disturbs her son. Joe turns out to be a law-enforcement undercover agent, working to bring down the drug ring. His relationship with Tracy and her son complicates matters as the time comes to make the arrest. Chris narrowly escapes being killed when he delivers the drugs and it degenerates into a shootout. In the end, he spends the night in jail and is put on probation learning a valuable lesson. He and Tracy move into a mobile home park and she retires from stripping. The Apollo moon landing is mentioned throughout the film as a sort of metaphor and Chris mentions in the end how happy the astronauts must have been to have returned to the earth no matter how screwed up it is.

Cast 
 David Arnott as Chris Cross
 Goldie Hawn as Tracy Cross
 Arliss Howard as Joe
 Keith Carradine as John Cross
 James Gammon as Emmitt
 Steve Buscemi as Louis

Location 
Some scenes were shot in the Miami/Key West surrounding areas. The Spanish monastery in the film is in North Miami and was brought to Miami from Spain in thousands of numbered individual stone blocks and re-built stone by stone.

References

External links 
 
 
 

1992 films
1992 drama films
Films about drugs
Films directed by Chris Menges
Films shot in Florida
Films set in 1969
Metro-Goldwyn-Mayer films
Films scored by Trevor Jones
Films about mother–son relationships
1990s English-language films